Breakfast in Heaven is a comedy album by Father Guido Sarducci (Don Novello). It was recorded at Washington Hall, University of Notre Dame, then released in 1986 by Warner Brothers.

Side one
 Father Sarducci is welcomed to the University of Notre Dame and recalls the early years of the institution.
 Doo Dah  history, folklore and myth.
 The pros and cons of singing about beer on buses are examined.
 How singing the short version of "Happy Birthday" can add six to seven minutes to your life, the candles on the cake, and a look at Ronald Reagan's neck.
 Central American Policy is discussed and arguments are made to bomb Canada.

Side two
 Father Sarducci looks forward to the 90's and unveils plans for the upcoming Columbus Cinquecentennial in 1992.
 Divorced lookalikes, emergency umbrellas and the missing commandments are highlighted in a preview of The Vatican Enquirer.
 Breakfast in Heaven.
 Father Sarducci answers questions from the audience about wearing black, the confessional and birth control for dogs.
 A medley of Beatles tunes.

1986 albums
Comedy albums by American artists
Stand-up comedy albums
Spoken word albums by American artists
Live spoken word albums
1980s comedy albums